The Inner Little Goose Island, part of the Badger Group within the Furneaux Group, is a  unpopulated small, round granite island, located in Bass Strait between Goose and Little Goose islands, lying west of the Flinders and Cape Barren islands, Tasmania, south of Victoria, in south-eastern Australia. The island is contained within a conservation area and is part of the Chalky, Big Green and Badger Island Groups Important Bird Area.

Fauna
Recorded breeding seabird and wader species are little penguin, short-tailed shearwater, Pacific gull and sooty oystercatcher. The eastern three-lined skink is present.

See also

 List of islands of Tasmania

References

Furneaux Group
Protected areas of Tasmania
Important Bird Areas of Tasmania
Islands of Bass Strait
Islands of North East Tasmania